Nicole Leslie Stanton (born October 26, 1990) is an American professional soccer player who plays as a midfielder for OL Reign of the National Women's Soccer League (NWSL).

Early life
Raised in North Bend, Washington about 40 minutes east of Seattle, Stanton attended Mount Si High School where she played for the girls varsity soccer team for four years. As team captain during her senior year, she received the school's Female Athlete of the Year honors and was selected to the All-Star Select Team by the Seattle Post-Intelligencer.

Stanton played club soccer for Crossfire Premier and helped lead the team to five state titles and a regional championship in 2006. She was also a member of the regional Olympic Development Program (ODP).

Club career

Seattle Sounders, 2012
Stanton played for the Seattle Sounders during the summer of 2012.

Sky Blue FC, 2014–2017
Stanton was signed by Sky Blue FC in June 2014 after playing for the team's reserve team and made 4 appearances in her rookie season. Stanton returned to Sky Blue for the 2015 NWSl season where she played in 8 games and started 3. She re-signed with Sky Blue on October 23, 2015. In 2016, Stanton appeared in a career high 16 games with Sky Blue and started 13 of them.

On January 18, 2018, Stanton was traded to the Chicago Red Stars along with teammate Sam Kerr as part of a three-team trade.

ETG Ambilly FFC, 2015
Stanton spent two months with ETG Ambilly FFC in 2015 as part of the Play Football Abroad Program.

Loan to Perth Glory, 2015–2019
Following the 2015 NWSL season, Stanton went on loan to Perth Glory for the 2015-16 W-League season. She played all 990 minutes of the season for Perth. Stanton returned to Perth for the 2016-17 W-League where she once again played every minute of the season. Perth advanced to the 2017 W-League Grand Final but lost to Melbourne City 2–0.

Stanton returned to Perth for the 2017-18 W-League season. She suffered a broken arm in a game on November 5, 2017, which forced her to miss a month of the season. Stanton re-signed with Perth for the 2018-19 W-League season, her fourth season with the team. Perth returned to the Grand Final in 2019 but lost to Sydney FC 4–2.

Chicago Red Stars, 2018–2019
In her first season with Chicago, Stanton played in 20 games for the Red Stars. She advanced to the NWSL play-offs for the first time in her career as the Red Stars finished fourth and qualified for the play-offs. Chicago lost to the North Carolina Courage 2–0 in the semi-final.

Honors
 The Women's Cup: 2022
 NWSL Shield: 2022

References

External links 

 
 
 Fairfield Stags player profile
 

1990 births
Living people
American women's soccer players
National Women's Soccer League players
Seattle Sounders Women players
NJ/NY Gotham FC players
Perth Glory FC (A-League Women) players
Fairfield Stags women's soccer players
A-League Women players
Soccer players from Washington (state)
Women's association football midfielders
Sportspeople from King County, Washington
Chicago Red Stars players
People from North Bend, Washington
Lesbian sportswomen
American LGBT sportspeople
LGBT association football players
LGBT people from Washington (state)
Klepp IL players
American expatriate women's soccer players
Expatriate women's footballers in France
Expatriate women's soccer players in Australia
Expatriate women's footballers in Norway
American expatriate sportspeople in France
American expatriate sportspeople in Australia
American expatriate sportspeople in Norway
OL Reign players